The direct market is the dominant distribution and retail network for American comic books. The concept of the direct market was created in the 1970s by Phil Seuling.  The network currently consists of:
 four major comic distributors:
 Lunar Distribution and UCS Comic Distributors (which distribute DC Comics since 2020),
 Penguin Random House Publisher Services (the distribution arm of the publishing company), which since 1 October 2021 distributes Marvel Comics and since 1 June 2022 distributes IDW Publishing (with Diamond switching to a Marvel and IDW wholesaler), and
 Diamond Comic Distributors, which distributes most, if not all, non-DC/Marvel/IDW comics (having exclusive deals with those publishers)
 the majority of comics specialty stores, and
 other retailers of comic books and related merchandise.

The name is no longer a fully accurate description of the model by which it operates, but derives from its original implementation: retailers bypassing existing distributors to make "direct" purchases from publishers. The defining characteristic of the direct market however is non-returnability: unlike book store and news stand distribution, which operate on a sale-or-return model, direct market distribution prohibits distributors and retailers from returning their unsold merchandise for refunds. In exchange for more favorable ordering terms, retailers and distributors must gamble that they can accurately predict their customers' demand for products. Each month's surplus inventory, meanwhile, could be archived and sold later, driving the development of an organized market for "back issues."

The emergence of this lower-risk distribution system is also credited with providing an opportunity for new comics publishers to enter the business, despite the two bigger publishers Marvel and DC Comics still having the largest share. The establishment and growth of independent publishers and self-publishers, beginning in the late 1970s and continuing to the present, was made economically possible by the existence of a system that targets its retail audience, rather than relying on the scattershot approach embodied in the returnable newsstand system.

Comic book specialty shops 
Prior to the 1970s, most comics were found in newsstands, grocery, drug, convenience, and toy stores. A handful of early comic book specialty shops first appeared in the late 1960s, stocking back issues as well as sourcing new releases from newsstand distributors and the new counterculture underground comix. The oldest known such comics specialty shop in North-America (or worldwide for that matter) has been Canadian comic book store Viking Bookshop, established in Toronto by "Captain George" Henderson in the spring of 1966, one year later renamed to Memory Lane Books when it relocated to other premises in the city. The oldest US comic book store is reputed to have been Gary Arlington's San Francisco Comic Book Company which was established in April 1968 in the namesake city. Neither store is in existence anymore, though the third oldest known one, the Dutch Amsterdam-based comic book store Lambiek (est. November 1968), still is as of 2022 – in the process becoming the oldest known comic book store still in existence. In the 1970s, the development of the direct market allowed a widespread network of comic shops to flourish. The specialty shop presented a number of competitive advantages:
 Timing: direct-market specialty shops were often able to obtain new issues a week earlier than newsstand vendors.
 Condition: the wire racks of grocery, drug, and toy stores were often only half the height of comic books, resulting in bent spines and dog-eared pages. In contrast, direct market retail outlets usually attempt to maintain their inventory in good condition. Their shelves are often the full height of the comic book. Many stores also included backing boards and mylar bags to further protect comics upon purchase (a practice that began in the 1980s and continues in some shops today).
 Content: direct-only stores could cater to older, more mature audiences, and thus can market material deemed too offensive (due to graphic violence, nudity, language, drug use, etc.) for grocery/drug/convenience/toy stores. In addition, due to the non-returnable nature of direct sales, typical direct-only stores contain a substantial archive of back issues. These retailers could also stock ancillary merchandise such as figurines, posters, toys, and novelties that would not be expected to be stocked by newsstands, etc.
 Price: The older, more mature customers of direct-only stores are typically willing to pay several times more than the average customer of a grocery/drug/toy store. Cover prices approaching (or even exceeding) $5.00 became common.
 Knowledge: The proprietors of direct-only stores are often collectors themselves, which means they are quite familiar with their inventories. Customers often have the option of phoning their orders in ahead of time, and by the time the customers arrive at the direct-only stores their orders will be set aside behind the counter (known as "pull and hold"). Direct-only store proprietors often arrange their inventory by publisher and/or genre, as opposed to the haphazard presentation of grocery/drug/toy stores.

History

Background 
Before the direct market, from the 1930s through the 1960s, most comic books were distributed through newsstands, pharmacies, and candy stores. The major distributors during this period included American News Company and Independent News, which was owned by National Periodical Publications, the parent company of DC Comics. Charlton Comics had their own distributor, Capital Distribution Company (not to be confused with the later entity Capital City Distribution).

In 1957, Atlas (later Marvel Comics), was forced to switch from American News to that of its biggest rival, Independent News, which imposed draconian restrictions. As then-Atlas editor Stan Lee recalled in a 1988 interview, "[We had been] turning out 40, 50, 60 books a month, maybe more, and ... suddenly we went ... to either eight or 12 books a month, which was all Independent News Distributors would accept from us." In 1968, while selling 50 million comic books a year, Marvel revised the constraining distribution arrangement with Independent News it had reached under duress during the Atlas years, allowing Marvel now to release as many titles as demand warranted. By 1970, Independent News was defunct, absorbed into a larger and changing distribution business.

1960s and 1970s
The underground comix movement of the late 1960s was part of an alternative distribution network that also served the underground press, which proliferated in the mid-1960s. As underground comix were not sold in newsstands or drugstores, head shops played an important role as retailers of those publications. The underground comix movement was based in San Francisco and a number of distributors originated in the Bay Area, including the Print Mint (beginning c. 1969), the already mentioned comic book store San Francisco Comic Book Company (which doubled as a publisher, beginning c. 1970), Bud Plant Inc. (1970), Last Gasp (1970), Keith Green/Industrial Realities (c. 1970), and Charles Abar Distribution. Around 1970, underground distributors sprang up in various regions of the U.S., including Los Angeles — George DiCaprio and Nova — and the Midwest — Donahoe Brothers Inc. (Ann Arbor, Michigan), Keep On Truckin' Coop/Big Rapids Distribution (Detroit, Michigan), Wisconsin Independent News Distributors (Madison, Wisconsin), Isis News (Minneapolis, Minnesota), and Well News Service (Columbus, Ohio). By the mid-1970s, Big Rapids had acquired all of its midwestern competitors; by that time, the market for underground comix had essentially dried up.

The direct market was created in the early 1970s in response to the declining market for mainstream comic books on newsstands. Fan convention organizer and comic dealer Phil Seuling approached publishers in 1972 to purchase comics directly from them, rather than going through traditional periodical distribution companies. Unlike the newsstand, or ID (for independent distributor) market, which included drugstores, groceries, toy stores, convenience stores, and other magazine vendors, in which unsold units could be returned for credit, these purchases were non-returnable.  In return, comics specialty retailers received larger discounts on the books they ordered, since the publisher did not carry the risk of giving credit for unsold units. Instead, distributors and retailers shouldered the risk, in exchange for greater profits.

Additionally, retailers ordering comics through Seuling's Sea Gate Distributors (and within two years, through other companies) were able to set their own orders for each issue of each title, something which many local IDs did not allow. This ability to fine-tune an order was crucial to the establishment of a non-returnable system.

Direct distributors typically were much faster at getting the product into the hands of their customers than were IDs: a direct distribution warehouse generally had re-shipped a weekly batch of comics or delivered it to local customers within a day or two (sometimes within hours) of receiving the books from the printer. By contrast, most IDs would usually take two or even three weeks to do so, though some moved more quickly. This factor was a strong drawing card for retailers whose customer base consisted principally of fans eager to see the new issues each week.

Finally, another factor in creating demand for direct sales distribution was that many IDs refused to deal with comics specialty shops or with any retailer who dealt in back issues on any terms at all, fearing that used comics could be purchased by these shops from readers for pennies, and then cycled back through the system as returns for full credit at a profit.

By the mid-1970s, other direct sales distribution concerns had sprung up, mostly regionally based (Donahoe Brothers in the Great Lakes region, Pacific Comics Distributors in Southern California, and New Media/Irjax in the Southeast were all operating by early 1974), essentially replacing the order-taking and fulfillment functions of newsstand distributors for the infant comic shop specialty market. For several years, Seagate retained an edge over its competitors in that it was able to provide "drop shipping" (the shipment of an order directly from the printer to the retailer) to its customers for quantities of 25 or multiples thereof per issue, while the newer distributors had to use more conventional methods, putting together customer orders and re-shipping or delivering them from their own warehouses. Threats of legal action and the need for retailers to order very precise (and sometimes very small) quantities of items ended this practice for all but the largest customers by the end of the 1970s, and extended the ability to provide drop shipping to those large customers to all the direct distributors — by which time several of the newer distributors had multiple warehouses.

Newsstand distribution through the IDs continued at the same time (and indeed remained dominant for years afterward, on its conventional returnable, low-discount terms).

1980s 
In the early 1980s, a trade organization, the International Association of Direct Distributors (IADD) was formed, consisting of all the distributors who purchased product directly from either DC, Marvel, or both. The IADD had annual conferences, issuing obscenity guidelines in 1987, and electing Diamond Comic Distributors' Steve Geppi as IADD Vice President in 1988.

As early as 1980, Marvel Comics saw the growth potential of the direct market, and by 1981 was putting out a number of titles geared specifically to that market (including Dazzler and Ka-Zar the Savage). By the early 1980s, all the major publishers were producing material specifically for the new market, series that would probably not sell well enough on the newsstand, but sold well enough on a non-returnable basis to the more dedicated readers of the direct market to be profitable.

Several of the new distributors lasted a relatively short time, and were succeeded by more competitive organizations; Diamond Comic Distributors replaced New Media/Irjax and Capital City Distribution largely replaced Big Rapids Distribution in the marketplace.

By 1985, the number of direct distributors in North America peaked with approximately twenty companies, many of them multi-warehouse operations, purchasing product for resale to retailers directly from either DC Comics, Marvel Comics, or both. There were also an unknown number, probably in the dozens, of sub-distributors who bought DC and Marvel product from these larger companies (and often the products of other, smaller publishers direct from those publishers), and re-sold to retailers. Most of these sub-distributors were in cities in which the direct distributors themselves did not (at least as yet) have warehouses, including Philadelphia, Boston, Columbus (Ohio), Madison (Wisconsin), Lansing (Michigan), Indianapolis, and Berkeley (California). Many of them were eventually absorbed by the companies which had been their principal suppliers.

From the mid-80s to the mid-90s, nearly every major urban area in the United States had at least one (and sometimes two or three) local direct distribution warehouses that functioned not only as distribution points for pre-ordered weekly shipments, but also as what could be described as "supermarkets for retailers", where store owners could shop for reorders and examine and purchase product that they might not have ordered in advance.

1990s 
As newsstand sales continued to decline, the Direct Market became the primary market of the two major comics publishers (DC Comics and Marvel Comics). In the late 1980s and early 1990s, as the popularity of comics collecting grew, many new comics shops opened, and existing retailers (such as sports card shops) joined the Direct Market, carrying comics as a side business. By this time, Diamond and Capital City each had approximately twenty warehouses from coast to coast, and both were functioning as fully national distributors. Several of their larger remaining competitors, notably Glenwood, Longhorn, and Bud Plant, had either sold out or gone out of business.

Such rapid growth (due partially to speculation) was unsustainable, however. The market contracted in the mid-1990s, leading to the closure of many Direct Market shops. Diamond and Capital City began closing local warehouses, moving from a decentralized model in which many local warehouses provided full service to a given area to a centralized one with a few shipping hubs and no local walk-in service at all. In 1994, Capital City created controversy by announcing penalties for publishers who didn't deliver their products within promised deadlines; this move followed an industry-wide push for 30-day returnability, a practice formerly in use when comics were primarily distributed in newsstands.

In early 1995, Marvel Comics purchased Heroes World, by that time the third largest distributor behind Diamond and Capital City, with the intention of self-distributing their products; Heroes World also stopped carrying other publishers' books.  Other distributors sought exclusive deals with other major publishers to compensate for the substantial loss of Marvel's business. DC Comics, Image Comics, Dark Horse Comics, and several smaller publishers made exclusive deals with Diamond Comic Distributors.  Most other distributors, including Capital City Distribution, Diamond's main competitor at the time, either went out of business or were acquired by Diamond. Others established niches — such as re-orders — in which they could compete.  When self-distribution failed to meet Marvel's objectives, they also signed an exclusive distribution deal with Diamond, which had by then become the primary supplier for the Direct Market.

2000s and 2010s 
In the early 2000s, Diamond continued to dominate direct-market distribution. However, the bookstore market began to challenge the Direct Market as a channel for sales of increasingly popular graphic novels. The growth of interest in comics among mainstream booksellers and book publishers led to several publishers arranging for bookstore distribution outside of Diamond (for example, Tokyopop through HarperCollins, or Fantagraphics through W. W. Norton), while Diamond created Diamond Book Distributors.

2020s 
In 2020, the COVID-19 pandemic resulted in public health authorities in affected regions ordering non-essential retail sectors and businesses closed for the interim. Diamond Comic Distributors announced on March 24, 2020, a full suspension of distributing published material and related merchandise as of April 1, 2020, until further notice.   As Diamond has a near-monopoly on printed comic book distribution in North America, this was described as an "extinction-level event" that threatened to drive the entire specialized comic book retail sector out of business. As a result, publishers like IDW Publishing and Dark Horse Comics suspended publication of their periodicals while DC Comics explored distribution alternatives, including an increased focus on online retail of digital material. On April 17, 2020, DC announced that two new distributors would be shipping their comic books — Lunar Distribution and UCS Comic Distributors, which are owned by Discount Comic Book Service and Midtown Comics, respectively. On April 28, 2020, Diamond announced that shipping to retailers would resume on May 20, after a seven-week shutdown.

Direct market distributors 
The list below includes sub-distributors, who bought their mainstream comics from one of the companies below but many of whom were on direct terms with one or more of the smaller or underground publishers.

United States

Canada 
 Andromeda Distributing Limited (Toronto, Ontario) — established in 1989
 Big Picture Distribution (Toronto, Ontario) — managed by Robert Myre
 Comex Distributors (Calgary, Alberta) — acquired by Portland, Oregon-based Second Genesis Distribution in 1988
 Galileo Distributors (Edmonton, Alberta)
 Multi-Book and Periodical (Toronto, Ontario)
 Robin Hood Distribution (Oakville, Ontario)
 Styx International (Winnipeg, Manitoba)

United Kingdom 
 Neptune Distribution — operated from 1986 to 1991, when it was acquired by Diamond
 Slab-O-Concrete — small press-focused distributor run by Peter Pavement; operated from 1994 to 2001
 Titan Distributors — operated from 1978 to 1993, when it was acquired by Diamond

See also 
 Comic book collecting
 Comic strip syndication
 Quarter bin

Notes

References 
 Beerbohm, Robert L. "A Short Synopsis of the Direct Market," Comics Buyer's Guide #1029 (Summer 1993).
 Beerbohm, Robert L. "A Few Origins of the Direct Sales Market," Comic Book Store Wars, the First Hundred Years (1995).
 Beerbohm, Robert L. "Secret Origins of the Direct Market, part 2: Phil Seuling and the Undergrounds Emerge," Comic Book Artist #7 (February 2000), pp. 116–125.
 Carlson, KC. "KC Column: Scaling Mount Baron," Westfield Comics (Nov. 16, 2009) — the inner workings of Capital City Distribution in the early 1980s
 Hanley, Jim. "Comics Distribution: An Historical View and Predictive Query," Comicon.com (Sept. 18, 1999).
 Luttrell, Hank "Comic Book Distribution: A Modest Proposal", 20th Century
 
 Stewart, Alan "A Brief History of the American Comic Book Industry"

1972 comics debuts
1972 establishments in the United States
Comics terminology
Distribution (marketing)
Comics retailers